Russell Marion Nelson Sr. (born September 9, 1924) is an American religious leader and retired surgeon who is the 17th and current president of the Church of Jesus Christ of Latter-day Saints (LDS Church).  Nelson was a member of the LDS Church's Quorum of the Twelve Apostles for nearly 34 years, and was the quorum president from 2015 to 2018. As church president, Nelson is recognized by the church as a prophet, seer, and revelator.

A native of Salt Lake City, Utah, Nelson attended the University of Utah for his undergraduate and medical school education. He then did his medical residency and earned a PhD at the University of Minnesota, where he was a member of the research team developing the heart-lung machine that in 1951 supported the first ever human open-heart surgery using cardiopulmonary bypass. After further surgical training and a two-year stint in the U.S. Army Medical Corps during the Korean War, Nelson returned to Salt Lake City and accepted a professorship at the University of Utah School of Medicine.  He spent the next 29 years working in the field of cardiothoracic surgery. Nelson became a noted heart surgeon and served as president of the Society for Vascular Surgery and the Utah Medical Association.

Nelson served in a variety of lay LDS Church leadership positions during his surgical career, beginning locally in Salt Lake City and then as the LDS Church's Sunday School General President from 1971 to 1979. In 1984, Nelson and the American jurist Dallin H. Oaks were selected to fill two vacancies in the LDS Church's Quorum of the Twelve Apostles.  LDS apostles serve full-time for life, and so Nelson retired from all of his prior professional positions.

Early life and education
Russell M. Nelson was born on September 9, 1924, in Salt Lake City, Utah, to Floss Edna (née Anderson; 1893–1983) and Marion Clavar Nelson (1897–1990).  He had two sisters, Marjory E. (1920–2016) and Enid (1926–2019), and a brother, Robert H. (1931–2014). Nelson's father was a reporter for the Deseret News and later became general manager of Gillham Advertising, Utah's earliest advertising agency. His parents were not active in the Latter-day Saint faith while he was a youth, but they did send him to Sunday School, and he was baptized a member of the LDS Church at age 16.

Nelson studied at LDS Business College in his mid-teens (concurrently with high school enrollment) and worked as an assistant secretary at a bank.  He graduated from high school at age 16 and enrolled at the University of Utah, graduating in 1945 with a Bachelor of Arts and Phi Beta Kappa membership. While at the University of Utah, he was a member of the Beta Epsilon chapter of Sigma Chi and Owl and Key. Nelson then attended the University of Utah School of Medicine, graduating with a Doctor of Medicine degree in 1947 ranked first in his class. Nelson began his first year of medical school while still an undergraduate, and completed the four-year MD program in only three years.

After medical school, Nelson went to the University of Minnesota for his medical residency. While at Minnesota, he was a member of surgeon Clarence Dennis's pioneering research team developing the heart-lung machine that in April 1951 supported the first human open-heart surgery using cardiopulmonary bypass. Nelson received a PhD from Minnesota in 1954 for his research contributions.

Medical career
Nelson served a two-year term of duty in the U.S. Army Medical Corps during the Korean War, and was stationed at Walter Reed Army Medical Center in Washington, D.C. While on duty, he was assigned to a research group formed by the commandant of the graduate school at Walter Reed, Col. William S. Stone and led by Dr. Fiorindo A. Simeone, a professor of surgery at Case Western Reserve University in Cleveland who had been a clinical investigator in the Mediterranean Theater during World War II. This team was focused on ways to improve the treatment of wounded and was sent to all five MASH units active in Korea along with two major evacuation hospitals, several field station hospitals, a prisoner of war camp and larger evacuation hospitals in Japan, Hawaii, and the mainland United States in order to implement such improvements. At one point, the team came close enough to the front that they received fire from enemy artillery positions, which missed them. After 20 months in service, he left active duty at the rank of captain. Following his military service, he did a year of work and surgical training at Massachusetts General Hospital.

In 1955, Nelson returned to Salt Lake City and accepted a faculty position at the University of Utah School of Medicine. There he built his own heart-lung bypass machine and employed it to support the first open-heart surgery in the United States west of the Mississippi River. That operation was performed at the Salt Lake General Hospital (SLGH, now University of Utah Hospital) on an adult with an atrial septal defect. Nelson was also the director of the University of Utah thoracic surgery residency program.

In March 1956, he performed the first successful pediatric cardiac operation at the SLGH, a total repair of tetralogy of Fallot in a four-year-old girl. He was at the forefront of surgeons focusing attention on coronary artery disease, and contributed to the advance of valvular surgery as well. In 1960, he performed one of the first-ever repairs of tricuspid valve regurgitation. His patient was a Latter-day Saint stake patriarch. He also provided the first surgical intervention for tricuspid regurgitation, a disorder that allows blood to flow backward into the right upper heart chamber.  In an indication of his surgical skill, a 1968 case series of his aortic valve replacements demonstrated an exceptionally low peri-operative mortality. Later, he performed the same operation on future LDS Church president Spencer W. Kimball, replacing his damaged aortic valve. In 1985, Nelson along with his colleague, Conrad B. Jenson, performed a quadruple bypass surgery on the Chinese opera performer  (1925–1989).

Nelson first operated out of the University of Utah's medical school. He later had a practice at the Salt Lake Clinic with admission privileges at LDS Hospital. In 1964, he set up his own private practice with him as the lead and Conrad Jenson as an associate. In 1966, Nelson became head of the thoracic residency program that combined resources from the University of Utah Medical School, LDS Hospital, Primary Children's Hospital and the VA Hospital in Salt Lake City.

In 1965, the University of Chicago offered Nelson the position as head of their department of thoracic surgery. Dallin H. Oaks, then a law professor at Chicago and a fellow Latter-day Saint, actively worked to recruit Nelson. However, after consulting with David O. McKay, Nelson turned down the offer.

Nelson became involved with the administrative aspects of medicine and was elected president of the Utah State Medical Association. He was chair of the Division of Thoracic Surgery at LDS Hospital.

In 1981, Nelson held appointments as a visiting professor of surgery at the National Institute of Cardiology in Mexico City and the Catholic University in Santiago, Chile. In May 1982 he was a visiting professor at the Hospital de Clinicas in Montevideo, Uruguay.

Nelson was honored nationally by being elected president of the Society for Vascular Surgery for the year 1975. He was also a director of the American Board of Thoracic Surgery. Nelson traveled extensively as a medical doctor and addressed conferences in many parts of Latin America and Africa, as well as in India and China.  He performed a total of nearly 7,000 operations before his call to be an apostle.

In 2015, the University of Utah, along with the American College of Cardiology, created the Russell M. Nelson MD, PhD Visiting Professorship in Cardiothoracic Surgery.

LDS Church service
In addition to his medical work, Nelson served frequently as a leader in the LDS Church. In Minnesota, he served as what was then known as Sunday School Superintendent in his local congregation. In Washington DC, he was a counselor in the bishopric of the ward Ezra Taft Benson, then an apostle, regularly attended while serving as Secretary of Agriculture to Dwight D. Eisenhower. In Massachusetts, Nelson was the secretary for the adult Aaronic priesthood organization in his Boston-area branch.

After returning to Salt Lake City, he was called as priest quorum advisor in the Garden Park Ward, working with over 50 boys ages 16 to 18. He next served as member of the Bonneville Stake YMMIA superintendency (a position roughly equivalent to a modern counselor in the stake young men's presidency) and then as a counselor in the bishopric of the Garden Park Ward. He was set apart as a counselor in the bishopric by Joseph Fielding Smith, whose son-in-law was the bishop. Nelson served in that bishopric for over five years at a time when the ward had over 1,000 members. He then moved to the Yale Second Ward, still in the Bonneville Stake, and was called as a member of the stake high council. He later served as a stake president in Salt Lake City from 1964 to 1971, with fellow future apostle Joseph B. Wirthlin serving as his second counselor. From 1955 to 1965, Nelson served as a missionary on Temple Square every Thursday afternoon for about two hours giving tours to visitors. The call to serve in this position had been extended to Nelson by Richard L. Evans, an apostle and the lead figure over publicity efforts on Temple Square.

Nelson also served for eight years as the church's Sunday School General President. During his tenure the Sunday School developed a unified 8-year-cycle of covering the LDS Church's scriptures in its curriculum. There was also a shift from having members of the Sunday School general board do all the training for new teachers to providing materials which developed into the book Teaching: No Greater Call. The hymn practice time in Sunday School was also renamed to worship through music.

Nelson later served for four and a half years as a regional representative. For approximately half of this time, he was assigned to oversee the fourteen stakes at BYU, while he worked with the stakes in Kearns, Utah, for the rest of his tenure.

Apostle
Nelson was called as an apostle by church president Spencer W. Kimball, to whom he had served as a personal physician for many years. Nelson was sustained as a member of the Quorum of the Twelve Apostles on April 7, 1984, during the church's general conference. He was ordained an apostle on April 12, 1984, by Gordon B. Hinckley. At the same conference, Dallin H. Oaks was sustained as a member of the Quorum of the Twelve. Nelson and Oaks filled the vacancies in the Quorum created by the deaths of LeGrand Richards and Mark E. Petersen. Early in his service as an apostle, Nelson was an adviser to the church's Young Women organization and was supportive of the developing of the Young Women values and Personal Progress program.

In 1991, Nelson served as the negotiator for the LDS Church with the Internal Revenue Service over whether contributions to support missionaries serving would be tax deductible. In 1992, it was identified he was on the Strengthening Church Members Committee, alongside fellow apostle James E. Faust. In 1993, he was the church's lead delegate to the Parliament on World Religions. For a time he was also the church's representative to a US State Department committee on international religious freedom.

Nelson's assignments as an apostle have included supervisory responsibility for the LDS Church in Africa. In 2009, he, along with his wife and others, were attacked while in Mozambique. He also made several other visits to that continent, including one to Kenya in 2011.

From 2007 to 2015, Nelson was as a member of the Church Boards of Trustees/Education, the governing body of the Church Educational System, and the chairman of its executive committee. He was succeeded as chairman of the executive committee by Oaks.

Following the death of Boyd K. Packer on July 3, 2015, Nelson became the most senior member of the Quorum of the Twelve and the quorum's president. Nelson was set apart as the quorum president on July 15, 2015, by Thomas S. Monson.

Nelson made his first international trip as quorum president to Central America from August 20–31, 2015. The following month, Nelson dedicated the renovated Aaronic Priesthood Restoration Site in Pennsylvania, where LDS Church members believe the Aaronic and Melchizedek priesthoods were restored.

In 2016, as president of the Quorum of the Twelve Apostles, Nelson declared that the church's governing council had received a revelation from God forbidding minor children of same-sex couples from being baptized without First Presidency approval. "It was our privilege as apostles to sustain what had been revealed to President Monson," Nelson said. Citing "continuing revelation", this policy was adjusted in 2019, such that First Presidency approval was not needed for the children to be baptized.

Eastern Europe 
After Monson's call to the First Presidency in 1985, Nelson was assigned as the apostle to oversee the work of the church in Eastern Europe. In this assignment, he worked closely with Dennis B. Neuenschwander and Hans B. Ringger. Nelson was involved in the first meetings between LDS Church leaders and government officials of Bulgaria, Romania, and the Soviet Union, and worked to continue LDS expansion and recognition efforts in Czechoslovakia, Hungary, and Poland.

In August 2010, Nelson journeyed to the dedication of the Kiev Ukraine Temple. Afterwards, in September, he traveled to church meetings in several European countries. He pronounced blessings upon Croatia, Slovenia, Macedonia, Bosnia and Herzegovina, and Kosovo while visiting each of those countries; these serve as addendums to Monson's 1985 dedication of Yugoslavia for the preaching of the gospel.

Nelson's only son, Russell M. Nelson Jr., served as an LDS missionary in Russia. In 2011, Nelson Sr. returned to Russia to organize the first church stake in that country, headquartered in Moscow.

Central Asia 
In August 2003, Nelson became the first member of the Quorum of the Twelve to visit Kazakhstan. While there, Nelson visited government officials, was interviewed by Yuzhnaya Stalitsa television, and dedicated that country for the preaching of the gospel.

China 
When he was Sunday School General President, Nelson attended a meeting where Kimball urged those present to learn Chinese. Nelson took up this challenge and developed elementary proficiency in Mandarin. He developed ties with the medical community in China and made several trips there to train surgeons. In 1985, Nelson was the first person ever to be made an honorary professor of Shandong Medical College. In 1995, Nelson went to Beijing, along with Neal A. Maxwell and other LDS Church leaders, on an official invitation of Li Lanqing, the Vice Premier of China.

President of the Church 

With the death of Monson on January 2, 2018, Nelson became the anticipated successor to the church's presidency.  Nelson signed 1,150 mission calls as the presiding apostle. After being ordained and set apart as church president on January 14, 2018, Nelson was introduced to church members and the media two days later, along with Oaks as his First Counselor and Henry B. Eyring as Second Counselor. Nelson chose not to retain Dieter F. Uchtdorf, who had served as Monson's Second Counselor, in the new First Presidency. This marked the first time since 1985 that a new church president had not retained a previously-serving counselor.

On April 14, 2022, Nelson surpassed Gordon B. Hinckley to become the oldest president in the history of the church. On August 8, 2022, Nelson became the church's oldest apostle ever, surpassing David B. Haight.

Worldwide ministry 
Since becoming church president, Nelson has visited members of the LDS Church in various areas of the world. Up through August 2019, he had visited sixteen countries, addressing thousands of members of the faith.

The first trip, called a global ministry tour by the church, occurred in April 2018, when Nelson along with his wife, and Jeffrey R. Holland and his wife, met with Latter-day Saints in London, England; Jerusalem; Nairobi, Kenya; Harare, Zimbabwe; Bengaluru, India; Bangkok, Thailand; Hong Kong; and Laie, Hawaii.

In June 2018, Nelson traveled to Alberta, Canada, where his second wife was born and raised, and gave three devotional addresses in three consecutive evenings.

In September 2018, Nelson visited the Dominican Republic, where he gave an entire talk in Spanish, which was believed to be the first time a church president had given an extended talk in a formal setting in a language other than English. On the same trip, he visited Puerto Rico.

On February 10, 2019, Nelson spoke to church members in Arizona at State Farm Stadium in Glendale. In addition to the large crowd in attendance, the devotional was broadcast across the state.

On March 9, 2019, Nelson met with Pope Francis at the Vatican. The event marked the first time in history that a pope and an LDS Church president met face-to-face. The meeting took place the day before the church's Rome Italy Temple was dedicated.

In August 2019, Nelson visited Guatemala, Colombia, Ecuador, Argentina and Brazil.

Organizational and policy changes 
The first few months of Nelson's leadership of the LDS Church saw many significant changes to church policy, although many had at least been heavily discussed before he became church president, and some were continuations of policies instituted by his predecessors. Nelson began his presidency two days after his ordination with a short broadcast to church members in January 2018 before then holding a press conference. This broadcast ahead of the press conference was unprecedented and provided the new leaders an opportunity to briefly address the entire church immediately.

In March 2018, the First Presidency issued a letter on preventing and responding to abuse. This letter reiterated existing policies, but also explicitly stated that no one should ever be counseled against reporting abuse to legal authorities. The guidance also had a clear emphasis on using counseling to assist in healing from abuse. It also provided more clear policies mandating all interviews with women and youth be done with another person in the general area, and made it clear that youth and women could have a parent or other adult present for an interview. It also adjusted previous policies forbidding adult males to teach classes of children or youth alone to apply to all adults.

During the church's April general conference, Nelson appointed Asian-American Gerrit W. Gong and Brazilian Ulisses Soares to the Quorum of the Twelve Apostles, both of whom had been serving in the Presidency of the Seventy.

Nelson also introduced major changes in church organization during the April general conference. First, the high priests groups at the ward level were dissolved, making all Melchizedek priesthood holders in wards and branches part of the elders quorum. A stake's high priest quorum now consists of current members of stake presidencies, high councils, bishoprics and functioning patriarchs. Next, Nelson ended home teaching and visiting teaching, replacing the programs with a focus on ministering, and shifting both the focus and methods of tracking them. As part of this change, young women ages 14–18 may be assigned as ministering sisters, similar to the-long standing policies of young men ages 14–18 serving as home teachers.

June 2018 began with a First Presidency-sponsored celebration of the 40th anniversary of the revelation extending priesthood and temple blessings to all worthy members without regard to race, in which Nelson gave concluding remarks. A few days before this, Nelson and his counselors met with the national leaders of the NAACP. That same weekend Nelson gave a devotional to LDS youth in which he urged them to more fully commit to the church. He encouraged them to collectively choose a period of seven days in which to abstain from the use of social media. On June 18, the First Presidency created committees assigned to form a unified hymnbook and children's songbook for the worldwide church membership, with each language edition having the same hymns (and other songs) in the same order, and that these committees would be taking submissions and collecting surveys until July 2019. It is anticipated that the process of creating the new unified hymnbook and children's songbook will take several years.

In August 2018, Nelson issued a statement urging the use of the church's full name. At the church's general conference in October 2018, he reiterated his position, declaring, "It is a correction" and "It is the command of the Lord." Nelson told members that the use of nicknames such as Mormon or LDS was "a major victory for Satan."

In the October 2018 general conference, Nelson adjusted the balance between a home-centered, church-supported form of worship. This was highlighted by shortening the length of Sunday church meetings to 2-hours from the previous 3-hours. At the end of the month, Nelson toured five South American countries, during which he met with Peru's president, Martín Vizcarra, gave a major address in Peru in Spanish, and dedicated the Concepción Chile Temple.

In December 2018, the church's First Presidency changed the process of youth class progression and priesthood ordination. Beginning in 2019, youth began moving between classes and priesthood quorums at the beginning of the year in which they turn 12, 14, or 16, rather than when their birthday occurs during the year.

In April 2019, the church's First Presidency published a revelation reversing a controversial November 2015 policy classifying same-sex marriage couples as apostates, and barring children of same-sex marriages from baby blessings, and from baptism until age 18. Nelson had previously characterized the 2015 policy as direction from God, stating "Each of us during that sacred moment felt a spiritual confirmation. ... It was our privilege as apostles to sustain what had been revealed to President Monson." Shortly after the change, Nelson said in a press release that the reversal was, "revelation upon revelation."

On April 5, 2020, Nelson issued a new proclamation, "The Restoration of the Fulness of the Gospel of Jesus Christ: A Bicentennial Proclamation to the World". The proclamation coincided with the 200th anniversary of Joseph Smith's First Vision and is the sixth proclamation issued by the church in its history.

Temples
Nelson's tenure as church president has been defined by an increased focus on worship within LDS temples. As of April 2022, Nelson has announced a total of 100 new temples to be built in several countries around the world. His travels have been punctuated by several temple dedications, most notably the Rome Italy Temple in March 2019, which was attended by all current members of the First Presidency and Quorum of the Twelve Apostles.

In 2018, Nelson announced 19 new temples, seven in April and 12 in October, among which were the first in India, Nicaragua, Russia, and Cambodia. During his April 2018 visit to India, Nelson explained to church members that the Lord had instructed him to announce the temple the night before general conference, though he had not originally planned to do so. With the temple in Nicaragua, Nelson fulfilled an apostolic promise he had made to church members there six years earlier.

In October 2018, Nelson concluded a 10-day trip to South America by dedicating the Concepcion Chile Temple. Following the December 2018 dedication of the Barranquilla Colombia Temple by Dallin H. Oaks, Nelson presided over the three-day dedicatory services for the Rome Italy Temple from March 10–12, 2019. Nelson took all the church's apostles with him to Rome for that dedication. This was the first time all ordained apostles of the church had been gathered in one location outside the United States. While in Rome, the First Presidency and Quorum of the Twelve Apostles took the first apostolic group photo in two decades.

In April 2020, Nelson announced plans to build a temple in Shanghai, China. Days later, the Shanghai Municipal Ethnic and Religious Affairs Bureau responded saying it "knew nothing about the American Mormon Church . . . building a so-called 'temple' in Shanghai." The Bureau added that the church's plans were "wishful thinking, not based in reality."

Marriages and children
While a student at the University of Utah, Nelson met and began dating fellow Utah student Dantzel White (1926–2005). They dated for three years, then married on August 31, 1945, in the Salt Lake Temple. Together they had ten children: nine daughtersMarsha, Wendy (1951–2019), Gloria, Brenda, Sylvia, Emily (1958–1995), Laurie, Rosalie, and Marjorieand a son, Russell Jr. (b. 1972). Dantzel White was a native of Perry, Utah, and first met Nelson when they were the co-leads in a musical produced at the University of Utah. During the 1950s, Dantzel was a member of the Tabernacle Choir.

Dantzel Nelson died unexpectedly at their home in Salt Lake City on February 12, 2005, at age 78.  The following year, Nelson married Wendy L. Watson (b. 1950) in the Salt Lake Temple. Watson, originally from Raymond, Alberta, was a professor of marriage and family therapy at BYU prior to her retirement in 2006. Her marriage to Nelson is her first.

Positions and awards
President of the Thoracic Surgical Directors Association
President of the Society for Vascular Surgery (1975)
President of the Utah State Medical Association
Director of the American Board of Thoracic Surgery
Chairman of the Council on Cardiovascular Surgery for the American Heart Association
Chairman of the Division of Thoracic Surgery at the LDS Hospital
Vice-chairman of the board of governors at the LDS Hospital
"Citation for International Service", American Heart Association
"Heart of Gold Award", American Heart Association
"Golden Plate Award", American Academy of Achievement
"Distinguished Alumni Award", University of Utah
"Surgical Alumnus of the Year Award", University of Minnesota Medical School
"Governor's Medal of Science: Lifetime Achievement Award", Utah Technology Innovation Summit
 "Advocate of the Arts" award presented by the Inspirational Arts Association.

In June 2018, the University of Utah endowed a chair in cardiothoracic surgery named after Nelson and his first wife, Dantzel.

Honorary degrees

Selected works
Books

Speeches

See also

 Council on the Disposition of the Tithes
 Michael T. Ringwood

Notes

References

External links

"General Authorities and General Officers: President Russell M. Nelson", churchofjesuschrist.org
Nelson on Special Witnesses of Christ

1924 births
Living people
American general authorities (LDS Church)
American people of Danish descent
American people of English descent
American people of Norwegian descent
American people of Scottish descent
American people of Swedish descent
American surgeons
Apostles (LDS Church)
General Presidents of the Sunday School (LDS Church)
Harvard Medical School alumni
Ensign College alumni
Clergy from Salt Lake City
Military personnel from Salt Lake City
Regional representatives of the Twelve
University of Minnesota alumni
University of Utah faculty
University of Utah School of Medicine alumni
United States Army Medical Corps officers
United States Army personnel of the Korean War
Physicians from Utah
Presidents of the Church (LDS Church)
Latter Day Saints from Utah